Giorgi Gogoladze is a Georgian rugby union player. He plays as Centre for Aurillac in Pro D2.
He was called in Georgia U20 squad for 2017 World Rugby Under 20 Championship.

References

1997 births
Living people
Rugby union players from Georgia (country)
Expatriate rugby union players from Georgia (country)
Expatriate rugby union players in France
Expatriate sportspeople from Georgia (country) in France